Mohannad is a masculine Arabic name meaning “sword made in India”. It is derived from the word for India (Al Hind الهند) and can mean both "India-ified" or "Indian". The iron used for it came from India.

Given name
Mohaned
Mohaned Abdulmahmood (born 2004), Sudanese Prince
Mohanad
Mohanad Salem (born 1985), Emirati footballer
Mohanad Ali (born 2000), Iraqi footballer
Mohanad Sayed (born 2002), schmeck

Mohannad
Mohannad Mahadeen (born 1973), Jordanian footballer
Mohannad Mahdi Al-Nadawi (born 1975), Iraqi footballer
Mohannad Nassir (born 1983), Iraqi footballer
Mohannad Ibrahim (born 1986), Syrian footballer
Mohannad Asseri (born 1986), Saudi footballer
Mohannad Maharmeh (born 1986), Jordanian footballer
Mohannad Abu Radeah (born 1986), Saudi footballer
Mohannad Abdul-Raheem (born 1993), Iraqi footballer

Muhannad
Muhannad (Sayed al Aidarus) 
Muhannad (Mujahid Emir) (1969–2011), Russian Mujahid Emir
Muhannad Saif El-Din (born 1980), Egyptian fencer
Muhannad El Tahir (born 1984), Sudanese footballer
Muhannad Naim (born 1993), Qatari footballer

Surname
Mustafá Abdelsalem Mohand (born 1975), Spanish footballer
Samir Si Hadj Mohand (born 1982), Algerian footballer

Others
Kıvanç Tatlıtuğ (born 1983), Turkish actor, known in the Arab world as Mohannad

See also

 Muhanad

Arabic masculine given names